Les Pyramides d'Atlantys is a submarine adventure game for the Amstrad CPC. It was published by Microids in 1986, authored by Luc Thibaud.

External links 
Article in french
Complete walkthrough for the game

1986 video games
Amstrad CPC games
Amstrad CPC-only games
Video games developed in France